The Official Secrets Act 1920 (10 & 11 Geo 5 c 75) is an Act of the Parliament of the United Kingdom.

Section 1 – Unauthorised use of uniforms; falsification of reports, forgery, personation, and false documents

Sections 1(1) and (2) provide:

"Misdemeanour"

See the Criminal Law Act 1967, the Criminal Law Act (Northern Ireland) 1967 and section 8(2) of this Act.

Sentence

A person guilty of an offence under this section is liable on conviction on indictment to imprisonment for a term not exceeding two years, or on summary conviction to imprisonment for a term not exceeding three months, or to a fine not exceeding the prescribed sum, or to both.

Section 2 – Communications with foreign agents to be evidence of commission of certain offences
This section creates a rule of evidence in prosecutions under section 1 of the 1911 Act.

Section 2(1) provides:

See R v Kent [1941] 1 KB 454, 28 Cr App R 23, 57 TLR 307, CCA

"The principal Act"

This means the Official Secrets Act 1911 (see section 1 above).

Section 3 – Interfering with officers of the police or members of His Majesty’s forces

This section provides:

"In the vicinity of"

This expression means "in or in the vicinity of".

"Prohibited place"

This expression is defined by section 3 of the Official Secrets Act 1911.

"Chief officer ... of police"

See section 11(1A) of this Act, section 101(1) of the Police Act 1996 and Schedule 1 to the Interpretation Act 1978.

"Superintendent ... of police"

See section 12 of the Official Secrets Act 1911, which is applicable by virtue of section 11(1) of this Act.

"Misdemeanour"
 
See the Criminal Law Act 1967, the Criminal Law Act (Northern Ireland) 1967 and section 8(2) of this Act.

Sentence

A person guilty of an offence under this section is liable on conviction on indictment to imprisonment for a term not exceeding two years, or on summary conviction to imprisonment for a term not exceeding three months, or to a fine not exceeding the prescribed sum, or to both.

Section 6 – Duty of giving information as to commission of offences

This section was substituted by section 1 of the Official Secrets Act 1939. It now provides:

References to a chief officer of police, a Secretary of State and the rank of inspector

See section 2(2) of the Official Secrets Act 1939.

"Misdemeanour"

See the Criminal Law Act 1967, the Criminal Law Act (Northern Ireland) 1967 and section 8(2) of this Act.

Sentence

A person guilty of an offence under this section is liable on conviction on indictment to imprisonment for a term not exceeding two years, or on summary conviction to imprisonment for a term not exceeding three months, or to a fine not exceeding the prescribed sum, or to both.

Section 7 – Attempts, incitements, &c.
This section provides:

"The principal Act"

This means the Official Secrets Act 1911. (see section 1)

"Aids or abets and does any act preparatory"

The word "and" in this expression must be read as "or". This is necessary in order to make intelligible sense of the section.

See also R v Bingham [1973] QB 870, 57 Cr App R 439, [1973] 2 WLR 520, [1973] 2 All ER 89, [1973] Crim LR 309, CA

Doing an act preparatory to the commission of a crime is not necessarily a crime in any part of the United Kingdom. This offence is an exception.

Section 8 – Provisions as to trial and punishment of offences
This section provides the penalties for the offences under this Act and under the Official Secrets Act 1911.

Section 8(2)

The words omitted were repealed for England and Wales by section 1(2) of the Criminal Justice Act 1948 (c. 58), for Northern Ireland by section 1(2) of the Criminal Justice Act (Northern Ireland) 1953, and for Scotland by section 221(2) of the Criminal Procedure (Scotland) Act 1975 (c. 21).

"The Summary Jurisdiction Acts"

The effect of section 17(2)(a) of the Interpretation Act 1978 is that the reference to the Summary Jurisdiction Acts must be construed as a reference to the Magistrates' Courts Act 1980

"Fifty pounds"

The reference to a fine not exceeding fifty pounds must be construed as a reference to a fine not exceeding the prescribed sum.

Section 8(4)
See Attorney General v Leveller Magazine Ltd [1979] AC 440, 68 Cr App R 343, [1979] 2 WLR 247, [1979] 1 All ER 745, [1979] Crim LR 247, HL, reversing [1979] QB 31, [1978] 3 WLR 395, [1978] 3 All ER 731, [1978] Crim LR 627, DC

See also
 Halsbury's Statutes
 Official Secrets Act

References

External links
The Official Secrets Act 1920, as amended from Legislation.gov.uk.
The Official Secrets Act 1920, as originally enacted from Legislation.gov.uk.

United Kingdom Acts of Parliament 1920
Classified information in the United Kingdom